Dániel Farkas (Danijel Farkaš; born 13 January 1993) is a Serbian football player who plays for Hungarian club Diósgyőr.

Club career
Born in Senta, he is ethnic Hungarian, Farkas has begun his career with FK Senta. In end of season 2011-12 he moved to Spartak Subotica.

On 24 June 2022, Farkas signed with Diósgyőr.

Career statistics

Club

References

External links
 Danijel Farkaš stats at utakmica.rs
 
 

1993 births
People from Senta
Living people
Serbian people of Hungarian descent
Serbian footballers
Serbia youth international footballers
Association football fullbacks
FK Senta players
FK Spartak Subotica players
Mezőkövesdi SE footballers
Diósgyőri VTK players
Serbian SuperLiga players
Nemzeti Bajnokság I players
Nemzeti Bajnokság II players